In quantum computing and quantum information theory, the Clifford gates  are the elements of the Clifford group, a set of mathematical transformations which normalize the n-qubit Pauli group, i.e., map tensor products of Pauli matrices to tensor products of Pauli matrices through conjugation. The notion was introduced by Daniel Gottesman and is named after the mathematician William Kingdon Clifford. Quantum circuits that consist of only Clifford gates can be efficiently simulated with a classical computer due to the Gottesman–Knill theorem.

Clifford group

Definition 
The Pauli matrices,

 

provide a basis for the density operators of a single qubit, as well as for the unitaries that can be applied to them. For the -qubit case, one can construct a group, known as the Pauli group, according to

 

The Clifford group is defined as the group of unitaries that normalize the Pauli group:  The Clifford gates are then defined as elements in the Clifford group.

Some authors choose to define the Clifford group as the quotient group , which counts elements in  that differ only by an overall phase factor as the same element. For  1, 2, and 3, this group contains 24, 11,520, and 92,897,280 elements, respectively.  

It turns out that the quotient group  is isomorphic to the  symplectic matrices .

Generators 
The Clifford group is generated by three gates, Hadamard, S and CNOT gates. Since all Pauli matrices can be constructed from the phase S and Hadamard gates, each Pauli gate is also trivially an element of the Clifford group. 

Hadamard gate 
The Hadamard gate 

 

S gate 
The phase gate 

  

CNOT gate 
The CNOT gate applies to two qubits. Between  and  there are four options:

Properties and applications 
The order of Clifford gates and Pauli gates can be interchanged. For example, this can be illustrated by considering the following operator on 2 qubits
.
We know that:
.
If we multiply by CZ from the right
.
So A is equivalent to
.

Simulatability
The Gottesman–Knill theorem states that a quantum circuit using only the following elements can be simulated efficiently on a classical computer:

 Preparation of qubits in computational basis states,
 Clifford gates, and
 Measurements in the computational basis.

The Gottesman–Knill theorem shows that even some highly entangled states can be simulated efficiently. Several important types of quantum algorithms use only Clifford gates, most importantly the standard algorithms for entanglement distillation and for quantum error correction.

Building a universal set of quantum gates 
The Clifford gates do not form a universal set of quantum gates as not all gates are members of the Clifford group and some gates cannot be arbitrarily approximated with a finite set of operations. An example is the phase shift gate (historically known as the  gate):

.

To show that the  gate does not map the Pauli- gate to another Pauli matrix:

However, the Clifford group, when augmented with the  gate, forms a universal quantum gate set for quantum computation.

See also 

 Magic state distillation
 Clifford algebra

References 

Quantum information science